Crisa–SEEI Pro Cycling is a Mexican UCI Continental cycling team founded in 2020.

Team roster

References

UCI Continental Teams (America)
Cycling teams established in 2020
Cycling teams based in Mexico